Stéphanie Cottel (born 17 February 1972, Charens, Drôme, France) is a retired French rhythmic gymnast.

She represented France in the individual rhythmic gymnastics all-around competition at the 1988 Olympic Games in Seoul. She was 24th in the qualification round and didn't advance to the final.

References

External links 
 Stéphanie Cottel at Sports-Reference.com

1972 births
Living people
French rhythmic gymnasts
Gymnasts at the 1988 Summer Olympics
Olympic gymnasts of France
Sportspeople from Drôme
20th-century French women